Ann Duck (c. 1717–1744) was a British criminal hanged at Tyburn in 1744. Her trials at the Old Bailey show that it was her crimes and not her race that was remarkable.

Life
Duck was baptised in July 1717 in Cheam, Surrey, shortly before her parents married. Her father, John Duck, was black and he became a teacher of swordsmanship whilst her mother Ann was white. She had at least three younger siblings: John (bap. 1719), Elizabeth (bap. 1724, bur. 1727) and Mary (bap. 1729). In September 1740 her brother John sailed with Commodore Anson's squadron to South America aboard HMS Wager, which was wrecked off the coast of Chile eight months later – a crewmate claimed that he was later sold into slavery on account of his skin colour.

Their father John died in October 1740, and by 1742 Ann was a member of the "Black Boy Alley Gang" of Clerkenwell. That year she was tried for assaulting a man. It appears that she was able to get away with crimes of violence because witnesses were afraid of her associates.

The records of her life in the courts indicate that there was "no apparent prejudice" against black people and her appearance and her parents mixed-race marriage was unremarkable. Duck's crimes did not go unnoticed and in 1743 she was described as a vile character at the Old Bailey. After nineteen arrests she was finally sentenced to be hanged on 17 October 1744.

Duck confessed and was hanged at Tyburn in 1744. Her trial may not have been fair as John Forfar was paid five shillings and ninepence for assisting in the conviction of Duck and another criminal named Ann Barefoot.

References 

1710s births
1744 deaths
18th-century English criminals
English female criminals
People executed by England by hanging
People from Cheam
Black British women
Black British history